Nocticanacinae is a subfamily of beach flies in the family of Canacidae.

Genera
Canaceoides  Cresson, 1934 
Nocticanace  Malloch, 1933 
Paracanace  Mathis and Wirth, 1978 
Procanace  Hendel, 1913

References

Canacidae
Brachycera subfamilies